West Virginia Route 80 is a north–south state highway in southern West Virginia. The southern terminus of the route is at West Virginia Route 83 in Bradshaw. The northern terminus is at West Virginia Route 10 south of Man.

Major intersections

References

080
Transportation in Logan County, West Virginia
Transportation in McDowell County, West Virginia
Transportation in Mingo County, West Virginia
Transportation in Wyoming County, West Virginia